"Breaking Down" is a song by American rock band I Prevail, released as the second single from their second studio album Trauma. In July 2019, it peaked at number three on the Billboard Mainstream Rock Songs chart.

Background
The song was first released on February 26, 2019, a month before the release of its respective album, Trauma. It was released within twelve hours of the first single released from the album, "Bow Down". A music video accompanied the release, which contained lead singer Brian Burkheiser covered in a black sludge, said to be "lyrical and visual representation of depression". It was later debuted in a live setting on March 11, 2019, at the Download Festival.

Themes and composition
Thematically, the song's lyrics are self-referential to the band's recent struggles with their rising fame, depression, and mental health. After working hard to establish themselves as a band, and succeeding in gaining popularity with their cover of Taylor Swift's "Blank Space" and their first album, Lifelines, a doctor diagnosed Burkheiser with polyp on his vocal cords that required surgery. The experience caused him to suffer from depression and almost give up on the band. Burkheiser explained of the song:

Burkheiser states that writing the song was therapeutic, and that it "given [him] a breath of life that [he] honestly never thought [he] would feel again."

Personnel
Band
 Brian Burkheiser – clean vocals
 Eric Vanlerberghe – screamed vocals
 Steve Menoian – lead guitar, bass 
 Dylan Bowman – rhythm guitar 
 Gabe Helguera – drums

Charts

Weekly charts

Year-end charts

References

2019 songs
2019 singles
I Prevail songs
Fearless Records singles
Songs written by David Pramik
Songs about depression